Bei meiner Seele ("Upon My Soul") is the fifth studio album by German singer Xavier Naidoo, released on his Naidoo Records label on 31 May 2013 in German-speaking Europe.

Track listing
All songs produced by Jules Kalmbacher.

Charts

Weekly charts

Year-end charts

Certifications and sales

Release history

References

External links
 

2013 albums
Xavier Naidoo albums